King's Quest VII: The Princeless Bride is a graphic adventure game developed and published by Sierra On-Line for the MS-DOS, Microsoft Windows and Macintosh computers in 1994. It features high-resolution graphics in a style reminiscent of Disney animated films and is the only King's Quest game with multiple protagonists: Queen Valanice and Princess Rosella, who are both spirited away to the realm of Eldritch, and Rosella is transformed into a troll. They must find a way to return Rosella to normal and find her true love, get rid of a powerful evil force threatening this realm, and get back to their kingdom Daventry.

King's Quest VII is the only game in the series to divide the story into chapters. Some puzzles have multiple solutions, and there are two possible endings. Critical reactions to the game were generally positive.

Gameplay 
King's Quest VII is different from the previous King's Quest games in terms of structure. The action is separated into six chapters, each set primarily in a different region of the realm of Eldritch. The player alternates between two heroines, Valanice and Rosella, with each chapter. The two heroines travel through some of the same places during the course of the game, finally meeting up again in the end.

Aside from the multi-chapter layout, the most significant change in game structure is the simplification of user interface by the use of smart pointer. When playing the game, the pointer lights up when passed over an object that can be used. Players can get or use objects and talk to characters by directly clicking on them, whereas previous games required the player to select an action icon and then click on the environment, and can click on the environment without indicating which parts of the game could be interacted with.

One of the game's highlights is its graphics; King's Quest VII has very elaborate and colorful graphics, compared to other games of the time, with painted backgrounds and animation techniques. The game makes use of SVGA graphics, new at the time, before The Dig and Space Quest 6. Also included are certain areas that pan from one side to the other, rather than going from screen to screen. Despite the cartoonish graphics characteristic of family-friendly computer games, the game includes several violent death scenes.

Plot 
The name of this entry, The Princeless Bride, is a pun on the title of The Princess Bride. Like most King's Quest titles, it is also a reference to the plot: Princess Rosella is soon to be a bride, but ends up in another world shortly before her marriage. It is the only entry in the series to feature Queen Valanice in a major role, and also the only one in which King Graham is not shown or mentioned at all (with one minor exception in version 1.4). Sierra marketed the game as an improvement in the series by stating that completion of earlier KQ adventures was not necessary to fully enjoy the game, even though the final chapter revealed a strong connection to the events of King's Quest IV.

Story
Walking through a forest in Daventry with her mother, Queen Valanice, Princess Rosella dreams of adventures in faraway lands and freedom while her mother pressures her to find a prince to marry. As they argue, Rosella sees in a pond an image of a castle in the clouds and leaps in, followed by her worried mother. The two fall through a portal together, but an arm suddenly snatches Rosella away, separating the two women.

Valanice ends up in a desert in the Realm of Eldritch and is left with only Rosella's comb. Valanice discovers from the ghost of a man who had died in the desert that an evil witch had closed the only way out, forcing Valanice to find a way to reopen it. By piecing together a turquoise arrow, Valanice manages to open the passage out and departs the desert.

At the same time, Rosella is pulled out of the portal into the Vulcanix Underground by Otar, the Troll King. To Rosella's shock and disgust, she has been transformed into a troll herself and is to be married to Otar. Seeking a cure and escape, Rosella encounters the friendly troll Mathilde who offers to concoct a potion that can cure Rosella in exchange for Rosella's help in finding answers to the Underground's recent troubles with the Land of Ooga Booga. Rosella is able to gather the ingredients and is cured, but the evil Malicia locks her away to prevent Rosella from distracting Otar. Escaping, Rosella discovers Malicia conspiring with Otar to cause the volcano the Underground is part of to erupt which will destroy the entire realm. Locating Otar's pet dragon toad, Rosella and Mathilde discover that the real Otar is being held prisoner in the Land of Ooga Booga while the one Rosella has met is an imposter working with Malicia. After escaping Malicia's clutches, Rosella uses an elevator to rise to the Land of Ooga Booga.

After passing through the desert, Valanice discovers herself in a forest where she finds out that Attis and Ceres, the Lord of the Hunt and Mother Nature, have been transformed into a stag and a tree respectively by Malicia. Worse, Malicia drove an iron stake into Ceres' roots, leaving her with a life-threatening wound that could spell disaster for nature if Ceres dies. Making her way to a nearby town, Valanice agrees to steal a magical statuette in exchange for a salve that will allow her to pass through a dangerous part of the forest. Though Valanice succeeds in stealing the statuette, she is arrested after recovering a giant block of cheese that falls from the sky, the moon of the realm.

Rosella successfully reaches the Land of Ooga Booga, but the passage back to the Underground collapses behind her. With the help of local Doctor Mort Cadaver, Rosella begins seeking out the real Otar while coming up against many challenges. After rescuing a black cat, Rosella receives one of the cat's lives and the location of Otar. With the help of a gravedigger she helped earlier, Rosella manages to reach Otar, but is imprisoned with him by Malicia. Using the dragon toad, the two escape and plot to return to the Underground to foil Malicia using a secret entrance hidden somewhere in the town. With help from Mort, they bypass one of Malicia's monsters to enter a swamp, but Otar convinces Rosella to enter Malicia's house and steal back a mysterious device that is the only thing that can stop Malicia. After evading a werewolf, the two manage to find the secret entrance in the town hall and reenter the Underground.

In exchange for returning the moon to the sky, Valanice is pardoned and manages to retrieve the salve. Acting on advice from a rock spirit, Valanice restarts the local river, breaking Attis' curse. Using the salve to get past the werewolf, Valanice makes her way to the Land of Ooga Booga where she locates and returns the Headless Horseman's head after being informed of recent events by the black cat. In return, he allows Valanice use of his horse Necromancer to reach Etheria. In Etheria, Valanice locates the Fates who tell her that the king and queen are gone and she must travel to a dreamworld to speak to Mab, the lady of dreams. Valanice is also able to get the ambrosia she needs to restore a magical cornucopia and break Ceres' curse. With the help of Mort, Valanice is able to enter the dreamworld while asleep, only to discover Mab frozen in a block of ice. With Ceres' help, Valanice is able to find a way to break the curse while Mab's brother provides a way into the dreamworld while she is awake. Valanice frees Mab who helps Valanice use the winds to contact King Oberon and Queen Titania. With the volcano close to erupting, the king and queen return to help.

After reaching the volcano's control room, Rosella and Otar encounter the imposter. Using Otar's magic wand, Rosella restores the imposter to his true form, revealing him to be Edgar, the handsome fairy who she encountered in Tamir who had helped her to save her father. Malicia knocks Otar out, blows Edgar away and imprisons Rosella who manages to escape and return to the control room. As Oberon, Titania and Mab attempt to contain the volcano, Rosella manages to awaken Otar who stops the eruption. With the help of Edgar and Necromancer, Valanice is finally reunited with her daughter, only to have Malicia attack. Malicia kills Edgar, but Rosella manages to use the device she recovered from Malicia's house to turn Malicia into an infant.

Multiple endings
The game offers two different endings after the final confrontation with Malicia. In the good ending, Rosella revives Edgar using the extra life that she  had received from the black cat that she helped in the Land of Ooga Booga. King Oberon and Queen Titania arrive and reveal that Edgar is their son who was kidnapped as a child by the evil fairy Lolotte before Rosella rescued him while in Tamir. He was subsequently kidnapped again and brainwashed by Malicia who Titania intends to raise to be a better person the second time around. Edgar reveals that he is the one who pulled Rosella to Eldritch and apologizes for his actions. Rosella agrees to Edgar's request to court her and the entire realm celebrates Malicia's defeat and the return of their prince.

In the bad ending, Rosella fails to revive Edgar and he dies. Oberon and Titania arrive and sadly explain what happened to him before taking Valanice and Rosella home.

Characters
 Valanice (voiced by Carol Bach y Rita) - After her daughter disappears, Queen Valanice ends up in the desert with nothing but Rosella's comb, which she picked up before going after her. Now the Queen of Daventry is on a quest to find her daughter, bring peace to Eldritch, and return to her kingdom.
 Rosella (voiced by Maureen McVerry) - Not wanting to be married, Princess Rosella believes she saw a castle in the reflection of a lake and jumped in. She now must stop her marriage to the Troll King, find a way to put an end to the wicked Malicia's diabolical plan, and return home with her mother.
 Malicia (voiced by Ruth Kobart) - The main villain of the game, Lady Malicia is a vain and narcissistic enchantress who is both human and faerie. She has been banished from Etheria, a faerie kingdom in the clouds above Eldritch, after attempting to overthrow her good sister. After regaining her powers, the witch decided to destroy Etheria in revenge and started attacking the various lands of Eldritch to take over the world. During the game, she is thwarted by Rosella and Valanice and ultimately defeated by the former who uses a magical device to transform Malicia into an infant. Originally the sister of Queen Titania, the queen decides to raise Malicia so she can have a new, better life.
 Edgar (voiced by Jesse Moises) - Not seen until Chapter 6, Edgar is the Prince of Etheria who had previously appeared in King's Quest IV, where he was kidnapped by the faerie witch Lolotte before he was rescued by Rosella. He was then enchanted by Malicia and turned into the Troll King, taking the place of the real king as her puppet. Edgar plays an important role towards the end of the game; when he gets hit by Malicia's spell, Rosella has a few seconds to revive him. Depending on Rosella's actions and choices, Edgar either dies or lives, and his parents subsequently mourn his death or celebrate his return to Etheria.
 Mathilde (voiced by Esther Hirsch) - The former nursemaid to King Otar, Mathilde befriends Rosella early on in her journey. In exchange for Rosella's help in investigating the troubles in the land, Mathilde supplies Rosella with a potion that reverses her transformation into a troll. After learning that Otar has been replaced by an imposter, Mathilde helps Rosella escape the Vulcanix Underground.
 Mort Cadaver (voiced by Marcus Lewis) - The undead doctor, undertaker and coroner of the Land of Ooga Booga. He acts as a friend and ally to both Rosella and Valanice, particularly after Rosella gives him a new backbone to replace the one that he had recently given away. Mort supplies both women with information and supplies that help them on their journey, even giving Valanice a safe place to sleep at one point so that she can visit Mab in dreamland.
 King Otar (voiced by Denny Delk) - The king of the trolls in the Vulcanix Underground. When Rosella and Valanice arrive in the Realm of Eldritch, he has been captured and replaced by an imposter. Rosella manages to rescue the real Otar in the Land of Ooga Booga and he helps her return to the Underground where Otar stops the volcanic eruption.
 Attis (voiced by Toby Gleason) - The Lord of the Hunt in the Realm of Eldritch. When Valanice finds him, Attis has been cursed into the form of a stag by Malicia while his wife, Ceres, is cursed into the form of a tree. Attis' curse is broken when Valanice restores the River of Life and he drinks from it. Subsequently, Attis returns the favor by saving her from one of Malicia's monsters. After Valanice breaks Ceres' curse, Attis departs to help defend Etheria from Malicia.
 Ceres (voiced by Carol Bach y Rita) - The wife of Attis and Mother Nature in the Realm of Eldritch. When Valanice finds her and Attis, Ceres has been cursed by Malicia into the form of a tree with an iron stake driven into one of its roots, a wound that will kill her and have devastating consequences for nature. After Attis is restored, he removes the stake, but Ceres' curse isn't broken until Valanice heals her with a pomegranate from a magical cornucopia. Ceres later gives Valanice information on how to break Mab's curse.

Development
The developers aimed for the effect of traditional animation works by Walt Disney Pictures and Don Bluth. As such, the full game contains more than five times the animation of any other Sierra game of the time. Art director Andy Hoyos specifically cited the intensity of the colors in Disney's Aladdin as an inspiration model. Composer Jay Usher said: "Just seeing how a character carries himself, acts, or walks ultimately determines the outcome of the music. We've tried to give each character [their] own 'mini-theme'. Each character is unique, so the music should be as well". The final game was much shortened from an earlier concept in order to fit the game on a single CD-ROM.

The game's backgrounds were hand-drawn and scanned. The game sprites were pencil-drawn on paper and also scanned, and then edited and colored digitally, not unlike the traditional animation process in animated feature films of the era. Of the 70 characters that appear in the game, some are more realistic and human-like (like the protagonists) and others more cartoony. According to lead animator (and character designer) Marc Hudgins, it was the first time when the art department had to use outside (Russian and Croatian) animation houses. Part of the challenge was that the animators had no experience in computer game animation.

Release

Reception 

According to Sierra On-Line, combined sales of the King's Quest series surpassed 3.8 million units by the end of March 1996. By November 2000, PC Data reported that King's Quest VIIs sales in the United States alone had reached between 300,000 and 400,000 units.

Some critics and fans of the series disliked the use of Disney-style cartoon graphics. On the other hand, upon release PCZone praised its "stunning graphics and superb gameplay". A reviewer for Next Generation approved of the series's transition from idealized fantasy imagery to highly detailed cartoon graphics, and said the game maintained the King's Quest standard for outstanding soundtracks. He concluded: "While it's certainly not the most challenging game available, it may be one of the most impressive in look and feel, and fans of the series should definitely check this one out". A review in Computer Gaming World hailed the game's "animation of quality that would make Disney proud". A retrospective verdict in Adventure Gamers described it as "an eminently playable, if not revolutionary, adventure game", and "a solid—if not stellar—entry in the King’s Quest collection".

Computer Gaming World nominated King's Quest VII as its 1994 "Adventure of the Year", although it lost to Relentless: Twinsen's Adventure. The editors called King's Quest VII "one of the year's most charming releases", and concluded: "The feature-quality animation and the hodge-podge of classic tales make it the closest we're likely to come to a fairy tale on the computer".

Notes

References

External links
 
 King's Quest VII at the Sierra Chest
 King's Quest VII Technical Help at the Sierra Help Pages
 King's Quest VII: The Princeless Bride at the Internet Movie Database

1994 video games
DOS games
King's Quest
Classic Mac OS games
Point-and-click adventure games
ScummVM-supported games
Single-player video games
Video games developed in the United States
Video games featuring female protagonists
Windows games
Video games about witchcraft
Fantasy video games